German submarine U-175 was a Type IXC U-boat of Nazi Germany's Kriegsmarine built for service during World War II.
She was laid down on 30 January 1941 at Bremen, and commissioned on 5 December 1941 with Kapitänleutnant Heinrich Bruns in command. After training with the 4th U-boat Flotilla, U-175 was transferred to the 10th U-boat Flotilla for front-line service. Throughout her career, the boat undertook three war patrols during which she sank ten merchant ships amounting to a total of  before being sunk by the US Coast Guard cutter  on 17 April 1943.

Construction and design

Construction
U-175 was ordered by the Kriegsmarine on 23 December 1939. She was constructed as part of Plan Z, a naval construction program that envisaged the acquisition of 249 U-boats along with numerous surface vessels by 1948, and which was in direct contravention of Germany's obligations under the Anglo-German Naval Agreement. The vessel's keel was laid down in the DeSchiMAG  AG Weser shipyard in Bremen on 30 January 1941 at which point it became known by the yard number or designation 1015. After about nine months of construction U-175 was launched on 2 September 1941.

Design
German Type IXC submarines were slightly larger than the original Type IXBs. U-174 had a displacement of  when at the surface and  while submerged. She had two shafts and two  propellers.

U-174 was fitted with six  torpedo tubes (four fitted at the bow and two at the stern), 22 torpedoes, one  SK C/32 naval gun, 180 rounds, and a  SK C/30 as well as a  C/30 anti-aircraft gun. The boat had a complement of forty-eight.

As part of the improvements of the IXC type over the previous IXBs, U-175 was able to carry an extra 43 tonnes of fuel, giving her a capacity of 208 tonnes. Her power plant was heavier than those in previous models, and in order to accommodate this and balance the boat, the engine room was built directly aft of the control room, as opposed to behind the galley like in other types. The periscope in the control room was also deleted, leaving the boat with just two of the optical devices, both of which were located in the conning tower.

Service history

Working up
U-175 was commissioned  into the Kriegsmarine on 5 December 1941 under the command of Kapitänleutnant Heinrich Bruns. Bruns graduated from the 1931 class and had previously commanded a torpedo boat, T3, which had been sunk by British aircraft in September 1940 near Le Havre. After recovering from his wounds, Bruns served on a training ship before transferring to the U-boat service in early 1941. He was 29 years old upon taking up his post with U-175. British naval intelligence, which tried to maintain personality and psychological profiles on all U-boat commanders, assessed him as "too ambitious and incautious". Nevertheless, he was later described by his crew as a "'humane officer' with more concern for...his men than the niceties of military protocol" who was "strict, but fair" and "dedicated to running an efficient, contented boat".

Between 23 December 1941 and 6 January 1942, the boat was assigned to the 4th U-boat Flotilla where she carried out acceptance trials, doing so alongside four other boats commissioned around the same time. These were successfully completed and the boat was officially accepted. She was then sent to Gotenhafen to undertake torpedo exercises. Freezing temperatures, however, kept her there  until late April. As they were ice-bound, the exercises were canceled; as such, the boat offloaded its crew to a depot ship, Frida Horn. They were finally able to complete their two week-long exercises in May off the coast of Hela in Poland. The following month she took part in tactical exercises, during which time one of her periscopes was damaged when she surfaced below a cutter. The result of this was that she was forced to put into Danzig for repairs before carrying out "silent-running tests" near Bornholm. These tests delivered bad news for U-175s crew as the boat proved to be "exceptionally noisy".

During this time, the crew was based at Bredower Naval Barracks. With the working-up completed, the boat was fueled and took on board a consignment of 15 electric and eight air-cooled torpedoes before departing for Kiel on 27 July. Around this time the boat was reassigned to Gunther Kuhnke's 10th U-boat Flotilla for front-line service, although this only became official on 1 September.

First patrol: Trinidad
On 10 August 1942,  under orders from the U-boat high command, Befehlshaber der U-Boote (BdU), U-175 departed Kiel along with a small escort and another U-boat – U-179. The two boats proceeded to an advanced base in Norway where they refueled two days later before continuing on their way to their operational assignments separately. Tasked with carrying out operations in the Windward Passage in the Caribbean Sea, Bruns took his boat into the North Atlantic between the Faroe Islands and Iceland and, after crash-diving to avoid an Allied aircraft, set sail towards Barbados. Shortly before their arrival, on 11 September, Bruns received orders from BdU to relocate his boat to the mouth of the Orinoco River and to carry out his patrols. After briefly patrolling around Bridgetown, where another U-boat had reported sinking two tankers earlier, U-175 took up station in its assigned area.

The haphazard defensive measures that had characterized the Allied convoy protection efforts in the region – and which had been taken advantage of so effectively during the early stages of Operation Neuland – had been rectified to some extent by the time U-175 arrived in the Caribbean. Nevertheless, the boat's first patrol in the area was a huge success. The first of these came on 18 September when, after having hit but failed to sink the Norwegian freighter Sorvangen, U-175 sank the Norfolk, a Canadian freighter belonging to the Canada SS Line. Four American ships followed this, along with one Panamanian, a Yugoslavian and a British ship, with the final one, the William A. McKenney, being sunk on 5 October. Finally, on 7 October, having fired all of her torpedoes, U-175 received orders to end her patrol and make for the U-boat base at Lorient, in German-occupied France; crossing the Atlantic via the Little Antilles and the Azores, they arrived there on 27 October. During the patrol, the boat had largely been unmolested by Allied aircraft, except for two attacks which occurred on 2 October, when she was bombed by a Martin PBM Mariner, but suffered only "light damage".

Second patrol: West Africa
Following U-175'''s arrival at Lorient, the crew received three weeks leave. In order to maintain a skeleton crew remaining behind, this was taken in shifts. During this time the boat was in the dry dock within the Scorff Shelter submarine pen. She stayed there for two days while her equipment was tested, then transferred to the Keroman shelter where the more extensive work was undertaken. This involved the removal and replacement of one of the periscopes, rebuilding the compressors, and overhauling the electric motors. The boat also received a Metox radar detector. By the end of November, the boat conducted short sea trials and was declared ready to undertake its next patrol.

This began on 1 December 1942, when late in the afternoon the boat, in concert with a type VIIC boat from Brest, was escorted out of Lorient towards the Isle de Groix. A brief period of panic was experienced by the crew when one of the lookouts mistook four porpoises for torpedoes and sounded an alarm, before realizing his mistake. A short time later, however, the boat was forced to submerge when the radar detector warned of an incoming Allied airplane. Bruns ordered a crash dive and resurfaced shortly afterwards, only to be harassed a number of times during the night by aircraft which began dropping depth charges at around 01:00 on 2 December. Most of these were aimed at the type VIIC boat that was traveling with U-175.

As they traversed the Bay of Biscay, U-175 was repeatedly forced to crash dive by approaching Allied aircraft. During this time the boat was plagued by almost constant leaking of sea water through its joints, which required tightening. On 4 December, after receiving a convoy sighting report from  via BdU, Bruns decided to attempt an interception of the convoy, which was believed to be east of Cape Finisterre, even though by this time the exhaust valves on the diesel engines were leaking. After being forced to crash-dive upon being surprised by an Allied seaplane, the leaks forced Bruns to surface and eventually break off the attempt to join the attack..

The boat then proceeded to its patrol area off the coast of Freetown, Sierra Leone, traversing a track between Grand Canaria and Fuerteventura in the Canary Islands. On 8 December they encountered a neutral Spanish tanker, the Zorroza, which Bruns allowed to continue on its way. By 11 December, without having encountered any Allied ships, the crew had managed to repair the exhaust valves and after reporting this to BdU, Bruns received orders to proceed to the Cape Verde Islands, where no U-boat had previously been sent. The submarine arrived there on 12 December before moving on to a point west of Dakar. For the next month, U-175 patrolled the waters off the west coast of Africa as BdU attempted to move them into position to attack ships in the area. Staying underwater during the day, and sailing on the surface at night, they spotted a number of neutral vessels during this time, but left them alone. They were attacked once by an Allied aircraft on New Years Day; again very little damage was caused.

At 18:00 on 22 January 1943, U-175 spotted an unescorted American Liberty Ship, the Benjamin Smith. The first two torpedoes fired at the ship missed, Bruns decided that it was too dangerous to remain on the surface and decided to submerge in case Allied aircraft were about. Early on 23 January U-175 scored a hit on the American vessel with the first torpedo fired, however, it continued sailing, so Bruns ordered another torpedo to be fired. This one missed, but a third struck below the mainmast and forced the crew to abandon ship. After questioning the crew in their lifeboats and pointing them in the direction of the nearest land, Bruns delivered the final blow to the Benjamin Smith by firing another torpedo which exploded amidships on the port side and sent the ship to the bottom.

Bruns then took his boat north to make a rendezvous with a Milchkuh replenishment vessel to complete refueling. However, while traveling on the surface they were surprised by a Catalina aircraft and only just managed to dive in time to avoid the depth charges that were dropped. An emergency release of ballast retrieved the situation, but resulted in the boat angling up abnormally out of the water. Upon coming to the surface, the boat was subjected to machine-gun fire which forced them to dive once more. Finally, late on 30 January, they resurfaced and made some hasty repairs which included rewiring the propellers so that they would both run off the starboard diesel engine; the port power plant had been badly damaged. The U-boat was then able to gingerly continue on its way. The attack had also breached one of the boat's fuel tanks and, as a result of a leak, the crew were forced to arrange an emergency resupply. Following this Bruns set off directly for Lorient; moving on the surface at night, they arrived on 24 February 1943. They had been at sea for 86 days.

Third patrol: Atlantic
Upon their return to Lorient, which by that time had been heavily bombed by the Allies, the boat underwent repairs, first on its periscope and then the damaged port diesel and the electric motors. In addition to this new batteries were installed and the compressor was given a tune-up. Meanwhile, the crew were housed in air raid shelters rather than a barracks, as all the other accommodation had been destroyed. A number of crew members were sent away on promotion or training courses and in their place new personnel arrived. As a result, the crew composition changed considerably; the average age on board by the time of the third patrol was 23.

The boat's repairs took longer than expected and instead of being completed by 4 April, it was not until the tenth that the boat was ready to depart on its third patrol. Nevertheless, when she left, she did so with repairs incomplete and a number of dock workers remained on board to finish these off while at sea. Departing Lorient with an armed escort known as a Sperrbrecher and three anti-submarine vessels, U-175 proceeded independently after passing Ile de Groix. In the days that followed, a number of radar contacts sent the boat below the surface. However, by 15 April they had arrived in the Mid-Atlantic air gap where they were out of range of Allied aircraft, allowing them to operate on the surface with less circumspection. The following day, BdU ordered U-175 to join an attack on convoy HX 233, a Liverpool-bound convoy which had departed from Halifax and New York City earlier in the month, which had been spotted by  while on a clandestine operation to pick up German prisoners-of-war. Steaming at full speed, the boat beat towards the convoy for 10 hours before finally spotting it just before midnight on 16 April.

In the early morning of 17 April, U-628 torpedoed one of the freighters in the convoy, Fort Rampart. A short time later, one of the convoy's escorts, the United States Coast Guard cutter , under Commander Harold Berdine, responding to a signal from one of the other escorts, the corvette HMCS Arvida, moved away from the convoy to screen the cutter while it picked up survivors. Once this was completed, she steamed back towards the convoy. The sound of the sonar pinging on the boat alerted Bruns to the danger and he gave the order for the boat to dive. However, Spencer launched a salvo of 11 depth charges which exploded above and below the boat. The result was that the boat went into a dive bow first and just as they began to restore buoyancy, Spencer launched a second salvo. This second attack ruptured U-175s pressure hull, destroyed the electric motors and damaged several batteries which, as a result, began to give off poisonous gas.

On board U-175, quick thinking by the boat's engineer to blow the ballast tanks had prevented them from sinking further and helped right the boat, but communications had been knocked out and it became clear to Bruns that the only option was to surface. Giving the order, the boat rose to the surface; as it did so, Spencer and Duane began firing at close range, while Spencers commander, Berdine, closed with intent to ram. But Bruns was not intending to fight it out and, seeking to save his crew, led the way onto the conning tower to signal his intention to surrender. The Coast Guard crewmen, however, did not immediately understand the Germans' intentions and maintained a devastating fire on the conning tower that cut down Bruns and a number other men and forced the others to delay their exit. During the firing, stray rounds from one of the merchant ships hit Spencer, killing one and wounding seven others.

At this point, Beredine, believing U-175 to still be in the fight, put Spencer about to ram the U-boat but the escort commander, Commander Paul Heineman, ordered him to "heave to" and put a boarding party across instead. As the remaining Germans began to jump into the sea, the Spencers boarding party attempted to get into the U-boat to search for documents and survivors. The boat quickly began to go under, though, and as a result they were forced to make a hasty departure without having found anything. Of the 54 men that had embarked in U-175, 13 were killed, 19 were rescued by Spencer and 22 were picked up by Duane, where they were formally taken prisoner, treated for their wounds and provided with dry clothing and warm food. Meanwhile, the battle for the convoy continued. A number of other boats, including U-382, U-226 and U-264 were badly damaged in the ensuing engagement and the Allies later reinforced the escort around convoy HX 233 and increased the air assets assigned to it. In response, on 18 April, BdU canceled operations against the convoy, which subsequently arrived in Liverpool on 21 April, having lost only one of its 57 ships.U-175s final resting place is recorded as south-west of Ireland, at position .

WolfpacksU-175 took part in one wolfpack, namely:
 Aufnahme (15 – 17 April 1943)

Summary of raiding historyU-175'' conducted three patrols and sank 10 merchant ships for a total of :

Notes

References

Bibliography

Further reading

External links
United States Coast Guard: Combat Action in the North Atlantic
Photographs of surviving U-175 crew-members as prisoners aboard the USCGC Spencer

1941 ships
World War II submarines of Germany
German Type IX submarines
U-boats commissioned in 1941
U-boats sunk in 1943
U-boats sunk by depth charges
U-boats sunk by US warships
World War II shipwrecks in the Atlantic Ocean
Ships built in Bremen (state)
Maritime incidents in April 1943